ʿĀtika bint Khālid al-Khuzāʿīyya nicknamed Umm Maʿbad is a woman who lived during the time of the Islamic prophet, Muhammad. She was from the tribe Khuza'ah. She is noted for providing a physical description of him. According to a book written by Ghulam Shabbir, she is also known for a miraculous event narrated in some Islamic sources. It was 622CE when prophet Muhammad set out for his migration to Medina (an oasis 300 miles north of Makkah). During the migration the prophet Muhammad came to halt near the tent of Umm Ma'bad; she was a very old lady. Abu Bakr, the prophet's companion, wanted to get milk from a goat, and found out that the goat could not even give a drop of milk. Prophet Muhammad is reported to have stroked one of the goat's udders, whereupon the goat gave copious amount of milk from which the migrating party and Umm Ma'bad refreshed themselves. 

She and her husband then went to Medina with her brother, Khunays (or Hubaysh) ibn Khalid, and embraced Islam. Her brother was martyred on the Conquest of Mecca.

External links 
 Umm Ma'bad, 'Atika bint Khalid - Ideal Muslimah
 “A Man of Evident Splendor” – Description of The Prophet

References

Arab women
7th-century Arabs
7th-century women
Women companions of the Prophet